The Very Best of Rufus with Chaka Khan is a greatest hits album by funk band Rufus and singer Chaka Khan, originally released on the MCA Records label in 1982. The collection comprises ten of the group's biggest hits on the ABC/MCA labels, including "You Got the Love", "Sweet Thing", "At Midnight (My Love Will Lift You Up)", "Do You Love What You Feel", "Tell Me Something Good", "Stay", "Hollywood" and "Dance Wit Me".

Release and reception 
The Very Best of... was released in late 1982, prior to the recording of the band's two final albums, both for the Warner Bros. Records label, and does consequently not include their hits "Ain't Nobody" and "One Million Kisses", both from the 1983 double-set Stompin' at the Savoy - Live. However, it doesn't contain any material from their 1973 self-titled debut album or their recent album at the time, 1981's Camouflage. It also doesn't contain any material from the Khan-less albums Numbers (1979) and Party 'Til You're Broke (1981).

The ten track Very Best of Rufus featuring Chaka Khan was re-released on CD by MCA/Geffen Records in the mid 1990s in both the US and Europe and is to date the only career retrospective available with the band. Rufus and Chaka Khan's ABC/MCA back catalogue (1973–1982) is as of 2003 distributed by the Universal Music Group.

In a contemporary review, Billboard said The Very Best Of revisits the group's "spine-tingling brand of soul-gone-funk", which remains potent because of Khan's singing. Village Voice critic Robert Christgau said the compilation contained Khan's "great Rufus songs". Stephen Thomas Erlewine gave it four-and-a-half out of five stars in his review for AllMusic, and Dave Thompson gave the record an eight out of 10 in his 2001 book Funk. "All the hits and no misses", he wrote. "A great comp".

Track listing

References

External links 
 

1982 greatest hits albums
Chaka Khan compilation albums
Rufus (band) albums
MCA Records compilation albums